Clanculus johnstoni is a species of sea snail, a marine gastropod mollusk in the family Trochidae, the top snails.

Description
The height of the shell attains 6 mm, its major diameter also 6 mm. The small, solid shell has a globose-conic shape. It has a carmine colour with radial buff dashes, about eight to a whorl, reaching from the suture half-way to the periphery. The umbilicus and the bordering funicle is white. As in allied forms, there is a colour dimorphism i nwhich olive brown replaces the carmine, a trace of which remains on the summit. The shell contains five whorls. On the penultimate whorl there are four spirals, the upper being a double bead row, and a fifth half-buried in the suture by the succeeding whorl. On the body whorl there are thirteen spirals which become taller, broader, more widely spaced and more inclined to break up into beads as they ascend from base to suture. The oblique aperture is finally ascending. Within the outer lip are about a dozen entering ridges, the lowest larger than the rest. The oblique columella is twisted, the edge reflected, with a large tooth at the base and a small one above. The umbilical margin broadly overreaches the cavity, its edge with three or four denticules. A translucent callus unites the lips.

Distribution
This marine species is endemic to Australia and occurs at intertidal depths off the Northern Territory and Queensland

References

 Wilson, B. 1993. Australian Marine Shells. Prosobranch Gastropods. Kallaroo, Western Australia : Odyssey Publishing Vol. 1 408 pp.
 Jansen, P. 1995. A review of the genus Clanculus Montfort, 1810 (Gastropoda: Trochidae) in Australia, with description of a new subspecies and the introduction of a nomen novum. Vita Marina 43(1-2): 39-62

External links
 To Biodiversity Heritage Library (1 publication)
 To World Register of Marine Species

johnstoni
Gastropods of Australia
Gastropods described in 1917